Ann-Sophie Barwich is a cognitive scientist, an empirical philosopher, and a historian of science. She is an Assistant Professor with joint positions in the Cognitive Science Program and the Department of History and Philosophy of Science at Indiana University Bloomington. Barwich is best known for her interdisciplinary work on the history, philosophy, and neuroscience of olfaction. Her book, Smellosophy: What the Nose tells the Mind, highlights the importance of thinking about the sense of smell as a model for neuroscience and the senses. She is also noted for her analyses on methodological issues in molecular biology and neuroscience.

Biography
Ann-Sophie Barwich, originally from Weimar, East Germany, received her Magister Artium (M.A.) in German Literature Studies and Philosophy in 2009 at the Humboldt University of Berlin with her thesis on causality in Leibniz and its relevance for theories of biological classification. She received her Ph.D. in Philosophy in 2013 at the Centre for the Study of the Life Sciences at University of Exeter with advisors John Dupré and Michael Hauskeller, taking a philosophy of science approach to olfaction theory in her dissertation. Barwich held a postdoctoral fellowship at the Konrad Lorenz Institute for Evolution and Cognition Research before receiving the prestigious Presidential Scholar in Society and Neuroscience fellowship at the Center for Science and Society at Columbia University. At the center, she worked in the neuroscience lab of Stuart Firestein on the project “From the Air to the Brain: Laboratory Routines in Olfaction”.

Research
Barwich's research focuses on the chemical senses, with olfaction as the main target of study. Her approach applies philosophical ideas to empirical research to inform theories and methods on how perception and cognition should be modeled in the brain. This combines historical and philosophical analyses with sociological, qualitative methods that include interviews with experts in neuroscience, psychology, chemistry, and the industry of perfumery. A prime example is the research that went into the book Smellosophy, in which she interviewed numerous neuroscientists such as Linda Buck, Stuart Firestein, philosophers including Barry C. Smith, winemaker Allison Tauziet, perfumers Harry Fremont and Christophe Laudamiel, sensory chemists such as Ann C. Noble, Avery Gilbert, as well as zoologists and biophysicists.

Her publications are clustered around two areas: (1) the perceptual and cultural dimensions of smell and its link to cognition, which brings theoretical analyses to the empirical exploration of three aspects of odor: its affective nature, its phenomenological structure, and its cross-modal influences with the other senses, and (2) the role of scientific expertise in laboratory-based neuroscience, focusing on how current advances in olfaction can contribute to the conceptual foundations of neuroscience. By tracking the emergence, success, and decline of standard laboratory routines, her research investigates the cognitive and behavioral patterns that influence scientific decision-making. Barwich is also notable in philosophy of neuroscience and philosophy of molecular biology  for her work on the historical and philosophical study of G-protein coupled receptors (GPCRs).

Awards
 Presidential Scholar in Society and Neuroscience fellowship at the Center for Science and Society, Columbia University

Media appearances
Her work, especially her book, has been covered by Science and national outlets including The New York Times, The Wall Street Journal, Harpers, The Spectator, and The Times Literary Supplement. Smellosophy has also been selected by The Daily Telegraph as one of the "best wine books to buy for Christmas." 

The parenting magazine Fatherly covered her work in articles on children's sense of smell, pre-teens' body odor, and debunking the myth that humans have a poor sense of smell. She has been interviewed by the Italian newspaper la Repubblica, Lynne Malcolm's All in the Mind program at ABC Radio National, and the Radio New Zealand Nine to Noon with Kathryn Ryan program. Barwich was also invited to appear on the game show Tell Me Something I Don't Know on Freakonomics Radio.

Podcasts 
 The New Books Network
 The Super Awesome Science Show
 The SCI PHI Podcast
 Sean M. Carroll's Mindscape 
 The Dissenter
 NOUS

Public writings
Barwich is currently a writer for the column Molecules to Mind: The sense of smell as a window into mind and brain in Psychology Today. She has also written on smell training and wine tasting for the NEO.LIFE magazine, on the philosophy and science of olfaction for Aeon and Nautilus Quarterly, and the importance of olfaction for philosophy in The Philosophers' Magazine. During the COVID-19 pandemic, she wrote about COVID-19-related loss of smell and what it means for our understanding of the mind for StatNews. De Standaard picked up Barwich's work to address one of the core symptoms of COVID-19: the loss of smell and taste. Focusing on the case of Mary Hesse, she has also written for Aeon on the erasure of women philosophers from collective memory.

Selected bibliography

References

External links
 AS Barwich's homepage
 
 Molecules to Mind blog
 Interview in "What is it like to be a Philosopher?" on her life and work

Living people
Philosophy academics
German women philosophers
German philosophers
German women scientists
Philosophers of mind
Columbia University alumni
Indiana University Bloomington faculty
Humboldt University of Berlin alumni
Year of birth missing (living people)